This is a list of public art on permanent public display in São Paulo, São Paulo (State), Brazil.

The list applies only to works of public art accessible in an outdoor public space; it does not include artwork on display inside museums. Public art may include sculptures, statues, monuments, memorials, murals and mosaics.

This list does not include military and war memorials.

List of sculptures

List of statues

List of monuments and memorials

References

Lists of buildings and structures in Brazil
Sao Paulo
Public art in Brazil
Culture in São Paulo
Buildings and structures in São Paulo
São Paulo-related lists